Martin Wagner may refer to:
Martin Wagner (architect) (1885–1957), German architect
Martin Wagner (artist) (born 1966), American artist and filmmaker, co-host of The Atheist Experience television show
Martin Wagner (footballer, born 1968), German footballer
Martin Wágner (born 1980), Czech photographer
Martín Wagner (born 1985), Argentine footballer
Martin Wagner (footballer, born 1986), German footballer